More Aggravation III is a streamliner slingshot dragster.

Built by Al Bergler, who did interiors for Funny Cars and bodies for dragsters at the Logge Bros. shop in Detroit, Michigan, the car was sponsored by Gratiot Auto, also in Detroit. It had a dropped axle with bicycle wheels, zoomie pipes, and a fully enclosed cockpit.

At the 1967 NHRA Winternationals, More Aggravation III took home both the AA/CD trophy and "Best Appearing Car" award.

Notes

Sources
 Taylor, Thom.  "Beauty Beyond the Twilight Zone" in Hot Rod, April 2017, pp. 30–43.

1960s cars
Drag racing cars
Rear-wheel-drive vehicles